Sir Thomas Hill Easterfield  (4 March 1866 – 1 March 1949) was born in Doncaster  the youngest of four children of Edward Easterfield, savings bank secretary, and Susan (née Hill). He attended Doncaster Grammar School, and later entered the Yorkshire College of Science, now the University of Leeds. He was then appointed a Senior Foundation Scholar of Clare College, Cambridge, from where he gained First Class honours in the Natural Sciences Tripos in 1886.

After graduation Easterfield worked in the Technische Hochschule Zürich, the University of Zürich, and later in the University of Würzburg under Emil Fischer, from where he was awarded a PhD in 1894 for his work on citrazinic acid.

In 1888 Easterfield returned to Cambridge as a junior demonstrator in the chemistry department. He was appointed a lecturer in the University Extension programme in 1891 and in 1894 lecturer on pharmaceutical chemistry and chemistry of sanitary science; he was also a master at The Perse School.

In 1899 Easterfield was appointed one of the four foundation professors of the Victoria University of Wellington, New Zealand; he and their two daughters set sail for the 90 day voyage on the Kaikoura from Plymouth on 11 February. In 1919 he became the first director of the Cawthron Institute, Nelson; he retired from there in 1933.

In 1935 he was awarded the King George V Silver Jubilee Medal. He was appointed a Knight Commander of the Order of the British Empire in the 1938 King's Birthday Honours.

Academic society memberships
Foundation member of the New Zealand Institute (later the Royal Society of New Zealand Te Apārangi); President in 1921–22
Nelson Philosophical Society; several times President
The  Australian and New Zealand Association for the Advancement of Science; President of the Chemistry Section 1909
Foundation member of the New Zealand Institute of Chemistry
Life Fellow of the Royal Institute of Chemistry of Great Britain and Ireland

Family
Thomas Easterfield met Anna Maria Kunigunda Büchel while he was working in Würzburg and they married there on 1 September 1894. They had five children, the first two born in England and the others in New Zealand:
Margaret Anna
Beatrice Mary
Muriel Helen
Theodora Clemens
Thomas Edward

Sir Thomas Hill Easterfield died in Nelson, New Zealand on 1 March 1949. His ashes are interred in the cemetery there.

References

 
 
 
 
 

1866 births
1949 deaths
New Zealand chemists
People from Doncaster
People from Nelson, New Zealand
Presidents of the Royal Society of New Zealand
Academic staff of the Victoria University of Wellington
New Zealand Knights Commander of the Order of the British Empire
English emigrants to New Zealand
People associated with the Cawthron Institute
20th-century New Zealand scientists